Kaali Khuhi is an Indian Hindi-language Horror film directed by Terrie Samundra, written by Terrie Samundra and David Walter Lech and starring Shabana Azmi, Sanjeeda Sheikh, Riva Arora and Satyadeep Mishra. The plot revolves around the girl Shivangi who is 10 years old who is trying to save the village where her family resides from ghosts.

Cast
 Shabana Azmi as Satya Maasi
 Sanjeeda Sheikh as Priya
 Riva Arora as Shivangi
 Satyadeep Mishra as Darshan
 Leela Samson as Dadi
 Hetvi Bhanushali
 Rose Rathore
 Samuel John
 Pooja Sharma as Young Satya
 Jatinder Kaur
 Sukhwinder Virk
 Tejinder Kour
 Amita Sharma as Young Dadi
 Satnam Singh
 Chand Rani

Release
The film was released on October 30, 2020.

References

External links
 
 

2020s Hindi-language films
Indian horror films
Hindi-language Netflix original films
Films set in Punjab, India
2020 films
2020 horror films